The 1985 British Formula Three Championship was the 35th season of the British Formula Three Championship. Maurício Gugelmin took the BARC/BRDC Marlboro British Formula 3 Championship.

Formula Three witnessed three major changes in 1985; in an attempt to eliminate ground effects, flat-bottomed cars became mandatory; the cancellation of the FIA European Formula Three Championship; and the arrival of Reynard Motorsport, giving Ralt the real rival for the first time since March Engineering stop building F3 cars after the 1981 season. Using a revolutionary carbon-fibre monocoque, a first for F3, Reynard manufacturer cars at the same pace as Ralt, but Adrian Reynard had a knack of producing cars that won on their race debut. The Reynard 853 kept that record going, when Andy Wallace won the opening race of the season. With no European series, the national series across Europe were greatly strengthen, notably the British, French and Italian.

Reynard driver, Russell Spence led at the mid-season break with 55 pts., from Andy Wallace on 50, Maurício Gugelmin, the first Ralt on 41 and Tim Davies with another Reynard on 34.

Ralt drivers later took over: Gerrit van Kouwan won three races after the break and notched up 40 pts.; Dave Scott won twice, scoring 36 pts. Gugelmin’s Ralt was sorted by West Surrey Racing’s Dick Bennetts and with two races remaining, he held narrow two points lead in the title race on 66 pts., from both Spence and Wallace, tied on 64pts. All the momentum was with the man from Joinville, Brazil, and Gugelmin won both these easily to win the Championship.

BARC/BRDC Marlboro British F3 Championship 
Champion:  Maurício Gugelmin

Runner Up:  Andy Wallace

Class B Champion:  Carlton Tingling

Results

Marlboro British Formula 3 Championship

Championship Tables

Class A

Class B

References

1985 in British motorsport
British Formula Three Championship seasons